Mathieu Albert Daniel Bauderlique (born 3 July 1989) is a French professional boxer. As an amateur, he won a bronze medal in the light heavyweight division at the 2016 Summer Olympics. Bauderlique was born in Henin-Beaumont, Pas-de-Calais, France where he still resides.

Boxing career
Bauderlique made his professional debut on 22 October 2011, with a fourth-round technical knockout of Lubo Hantak. He amassed a 13-1 record during the next six years, with seven stoppage victories.

Bauderlique was scheduled to face Eddy Lacrosse for the vacant French National Light heavyweight title on 28 April 2018. He won the fight by unanimous decision, with scores of 97-92, 99-92 and 96-93. Bauderlique was scheduled to face Yann Binanga Aboghe for the vacant WBC Francophone Light heavyweight title on 11 October 2018. He won the fight by unanimous decision, with two judges awarding him a 99-91 scorecard, while the third judge scored all ten rounds for him. In his last fight of 2018, Bauderlique faced Patrick Bois on 4 December. He won the fight by a fourth-round technical knockout.

Bauderlique was scheduled to face Mustafa Chadlioui for the vacant WBA Inter-continental Light heavyweight title on 28 March 2019. Chadlioui retired from the fight at the end of the eight round. Bauderlique the first defense of his title against Doudou Ngumbu on 18 July 2019. He won the fight by unanimous decision, with scores of 119-108, 117-110 and 119-108. Bauderlique made his second and final title defense against Hugo Kasperski on 13 December 2019, and won the fight by a fifth-round technical knockout.

Bauderlique faced Deibis Berrocal on 5 December 2020, in his sole fight of the year. He won the fight by a second-round technical knockout.

Bauderlique was scheduled to fight Igor Mikhalkin for the vacant EBU Light heavyweight title on 10 September 2021. Mikhalkin retired from the bout at the end of the seventh round.

Professional boxing record

References

External links

 

1989 births
Living people
French male boxers
Olympic boxers of France
Boxers at the 2016 Summer Olympics
Place of birth missing (living people)
Medalists at the 2016 Summer Olympics
Olympic bronze medalists for France
Olympic medalists in boxing
Light-heavyweight boxers
People from Hénin-Beaumont
Sportspeople from Pas-de-Calais